Robert Terrell "Terry" Cummings (born March 15, 1961) is an American former professional basketball player who played 18 seasons in the National Basketball Association (NBA). Cummings was voted Rookie of the Year and was a two-time All-Star, a two-time All-NBA selection and was a lead player on several postseason teams while in Milwaukee and San Antonio.

College Years
Born in Chicago and a graduate of Carver High School, Cummings attended Depaul University from 1979 to 1982. He averaged 16.4 points per game over 85 games and entered the 1982 NBA draft after departing from school.

NBA

San Diego Clippers 
He was selected in the first round by the San Diego Clippers as the second overall pick, right after James Worthy was by the Clippers’ eventual crosstown-rivals, the Lakers. Before the season even began, Cummings’ bumped heads with San Diego’s now-infamous owner, Donald Sterling. While Sterling had training camp conducted at a naval base, he made all players do their own laundry. As a result of that, and other tense exchanges, Cummings’ agent tried to negotiate a one-year deal to get his client away from the Clippers as soon as possible, however, the two sides eventually agreed to a four-year contract during the preseason.

In his inaugural 1982–83 season, he won the NBA Rookie of the Year Award after putting up 23.7 points and 10.4 rebounds per game. These figures would turn out to be the highest of his career in those categories. On March 9, 1983, Cummings scored a then career best 39 points, along with grabbing 18 rebounds, during a 119-114 loss to the Los Angeles Lakers. Late in his rookie season, Cummings suffered from heartbeat irregularities, which would keep him out the remaining two weeks of the season.  The team lost every game without him.

Milwaukee Bucks 
After the next season (1983–84), he was traded to the Milwaukee Bucks, where he would continue to post above 20 points and 8 rebound averages for four out of his five years on the team.

In the 1985 NBA playoffs, Cummings (29.5 points) averaged more points than then-rookie Michael Jordan (29.3 points) in a 3–1 series victory for Milwaukee. It would be the only time Jordan would not lead all scorers in a postseason series he participated in during his career. The Bucks would lose in the next round in an upset to the lower seeded Philadelphia 76ers in a 4–0 sweep.

The following season, Cummings and now hall of fame-enshrined teammate Sidney Moncrief led the Bucks to a 57–25 record and an Eastern Conference Finals appearance. On January 6, 1986, Cummings scored 16 points, grabbed 17 rebounds, and recorded 4 assists in a win against the Cleveland Cavaliers. During that season’s postseason run, on April 22, 1986, Cummings scored 23 points, grabbed 11 rebounds, and recorded a playoffs career-high 3 blocks in the final game of a 3–0 first round sweep of the New Jersey Nets. In the following round, Cummings played the lead role in the Bucks advancing past Julius Erving and the 76ers in a contested seven games series, while his co-star Moncrief missed four games due to injury. Cummings led all scorers with 27 points in Milwaukee's 113-112 Game 7 win over Philadelphia, despite playing through a dislocated finger. However, in a familiar pattern for the 1980s Bucks, they would ultimately fail to reach the NBA Finals, this time losing to the Boston Celtics.

On January 9, 1987, Cummings grabbed a career high 24 rebounds, alongside scoring 28 points, in a 100–92 loss to the Washington Bullets. On January 16, 1987, in what was arguably the best game of his career, Cummings recorded a triple double with 39 points, 15 rebounds, and 10 assists, while adding a career-high 6 steals in a 124–122 loss versus the Dallas Mavericks. Both Sidney Moncrief and Paul Pressey were out with injuries, and only one teammate of Cummings’ (Ricky Pierce, 27 points) scored more than 14 points. That postseason, Cummings and the Bucks again advanced past Philadelphia, as he averaged 21.4 points and 6.2 rebounds per game. On May 10, 1987, Cummings scored 31 points in a Eastern Semifinals Game 4 138–137 overtime loss against the Boston Celtics. The Bucks would eventually lose the series in 7 games.

On March 1, 1989, Cummings scored 38 points and grabbed 10 rebounds in a 121–111 win against the New York Knicks.

As a Buck, Cummings was selected to play in the 1984–85 and 1988–89 NBA All-Star Games.

San Antonio Spurs 
He was traded to the San Antonio Spurs on May 28, 1989. He was sent with a 1990 2nd round draft pick (Tony Massenburg was later selected) for Cadillac Anderson, Alvin Robertson and a 1989 2nd round draft pick (Frank Kornet was later selected).

His first season in San Antonio, alongside David Robinson and Maurice Cheeks, brought a remarkable turn around, the Spurs surged from 21 wins in 1989 to 56 wins in 1990. That season, Cummings set a career high in points scored in a single game, with 52 in a 129-95 win over the Charlotte Hornets.

He would remain in San Antonio for six years. His scoring and rebounding averages for the 1989–90 through 1991–92 seasons were close to 20 and 8, respectively, and he helped his team to consecutive 50-win seasons and playoff appearances. By this time, he was recognized as a reliable power forward in the league.

Cummings suffered a serious knee injury in the summer of 1992 in a casual pickup game. He would miss the first 74 regular-season games. Upon his return to the lineup, he could no longer put up near-All-Star numbers, and from then on he was used in a more suitable role as a reserve. Cummings would play in San Antonio until 1994–95.

Return to Bucks 
In November 1995, he joined the Milwaukee Bucks again.  He played 81 games averaging 8.0 points per game in 21 minutes of work.

Seattle Supersonics 
In January 1997 he signed with the Seattle SuperSonics as a free agent.  He contributed as a role player helping the Sonics reach the Western Conference Semi-finals where they lost to the Houston Rockets in 7 games.

Philadelphia 76ers 
He signed with the 76ers in September 1997.  He played in 44 games averaging 5.3 points per game.

New York Knicks 
Just before the trade deadline in February 1998, he was traded to the New York Knicks for Herb Williams and Ron Grandison.  For the New York Knicks he played in 30 games to finish the 1997–98 season and a total of 74 games combined between Philadelphia and New York.

Golden State Warriors 
Before the lockout ending in 1999, he was traded by the Knicks along with John Starks and Chris Mills to the Golden State Warriors for Latrell Sprewell.  He managed to play 2 seasons for the Warriors, then retired from basketball after the 1999–2000 season.

In his final season, despite serious injuries and then being 38 years old, he averaged 8.4 PPG and 4.9 RPG in just 18 minutes a night.

Career summary 
In 18 seasons, Cummings scored 19,460 points, placing him 57th on the list of NBA all-time regular-season scoring leaders, as of December 2022. He finished with averages of 16.4 points per game and 7.3 rebounds per game. He also played in 1,183 games, had 33,898 minutes, a .484 field goal percentage (8,045 for 16,628), .706 free throw percentage (3,326 for 4,711), 8,630 total rebounds (3,183 offensive, 5,447 defensive), and 1,255 steals.

Personal life
Cummings wanted to be a professional hockey player growing up, and had not attempted playing competitive basketball until an unexpected high school growth-spurt.

On April 4, 1985, Cummings sang the national anthem in Milwaukee before playing in a home game versus the Detroit Pistons. He received a standing ovation. In December 1989, Cummings and several Spurs teammates released a Christmas song.

Cummings has been an ordained Pentecostal minister since 1977  and performed the wedding of former teammate Sean Elliott. He has three sons, Antonio, T. J., and Shawn.

In a creative turn of his career, Cummings released an album, T.C. Finally in early 2007, of songs which he wrote, sang, and played keyboards. The album is reminiscent of the R&B/soulstyles of musicians such as Marvin Gaye, Al Green, and Sam Cooke.

NBA career statistics

Regular season 

|-
| style="text-align:left;"| 
| style="text-align:left;"| San Diego
| 70 || 69 || 36.2 || .523 || .000 || .709 || 10.6 || 2.5 || 1.8 || .9 || 23.7
|-
| style="text-align:left;"| 
| style="text-align:left;"| San Diego
| 81 || 80 || 35.9 || .494 || .000 || .720 || 9.6 || 1.7 || 1.1 || .7 || 22.9
|-
| style="text-align:left;"| 
| style="text-align:left;"| Milwaukee
| 79 || 78 || 34.5 || .495 || .000 || .741 || 9.1 || 2.9 || 1.5 || .8 || 23.6
|-
| style="text-align:left;"| 
| style="text-align:left;"| Milwaukee
| 82 || 82 || 32.5 || .474 || .000 || .656 || 8.5 || 2.4 || 1.5 || .6 || 19.8
|-
| style="text-align:left;"| 
| style="text-align:left;"| Milwaukee
| 82 || 77 || 33.8 || .511 || .000 || .662 || 8.5 || 2.8 || 1.6 || 1.0 || 20.8
|-
| style="text-align:left;"| 
| style="text-align:left;"| Milwaukee
| 76 || 76 || 34.6 || .485 || .333 || .665 || 7.3 || 2.4 || 1.0 || .6 || 21.3
|-
| style="text-align:left;"| 
| style="text-align:left;"| Milwaukee
| 80 || 78 || 35.3 || .467 || .467 || .787 || 8.1 || 2.5 || 1.3 || .9 || 22.9
|-
| style="text-align:left;"| 
| style="text-align:left;"| San Antonio
| 81 || 78 || 34.8 || .475 || .322 || .780 || 8.4 || 2.7 || 1.4 || .6 || 22.4
|-
| style="text-align:left;"| 
| style="text-align:left;"| San Antonio
| 67 || 62 || 32.8 || .484 || .212 || .683 || 7.8 || 2.3 || .9 || .4 || 17.6
|-
| style="text-align:left;"| 
| style="text-align:left;"| San Antonio
| 70 || 67 || 30.7 || .488 || .385 || .711 || 9.0 || 1.5 || .8 || .5 || 17.3
|-
| style="text-align:left;"| 
| style="text-align:left;"| San Antonio
| 8 || 0 || 9.5 || .379 || – || .500 || 2.4 || .5 || .1 || .1 || 3.4
|-
| style="text-align:left;"| 
| style="text-align:left;"| San Antonio
| 59 || 29 || 19.2 || .428 || .000 || .589 || 5.0 || .8 || .5 || .2 || 7.3
|-
| style="text-align:left;"| 
| style="text-align:left;"| San Antonio
| 76 || 20 || 16.8 || .483 || – || .585 || 5.0 || .8 || .5 || .3 || 6.8
|-
| style="text-align:left;"| 
| style="text-align:left;"| Milwaukee
| 81 || 13 || 21.9 || .462 || .143 || .650 || 5.5 || 1.1 || .7 || .4 || 8.0
|-
| style="text-align:left;"| 
| style="text-align:left;"| Seattle
| 45 || 3 || 18.4 || .486 || .600 || .695 || 4.1 || .9 || .7 || .2 || 8.2
|-
| style="text-align:left;"| 
| style="text-align:left;"| Philadelphia
| 44 || 2 || 14.9 || .458 || .000 || .672 || 3.4 || .5 || .5 || .1 || 5.3
|-
| style="text-align:left;"| 
| style="text-align:left;"| New York
| 30 || 1 || 17.6 || .477 || – || .700 || 4.5 || .9 || .5 || .2 || 7.8
|-
| style="text-align:left;"| 
| style="text-align:left;"| Golden State
| 50 || 0 || 20.2 || .439 || 1.000 || .711 || 5.1 || 1.2 || .9 || .2 || 9.1
|-
| style="text-align:left;"| 
| style="text-align:left;"| Golden State
| 22 || 0 || 18.1 || .429 || – || .821 || 4.9 || 1.0 || .6 || .4 || 8.4
|- class="sortbottom"
| style="text-align:center;" colspan="2"| Career
| 1,183 || 815 || 28.7 || .484 || .295 || .706 || 7.3 || 1.9 || 1.1 || .5 || 16.4
|- class="sortbottom"
| style="text-align:center;" colspan="2"| All-Star
| 2 || 0 || 17.5 || .423 || – || .833 || 6.0 || .5 || 1.5 || 1.0 || 13.5

Playoffs 

|-
| style="text-align:left;"| 1985
| style="text-align:left;"| Milwaukee
| 8 || 8 || 38.9 || .577 || .000 || .828 || 8.8 || 2.5 || 1.5 || .9 || 27.5
|-
| style="text-align:left;"| 1986
| style="text-align:left;"| Milwaukee
| 14 || 14 || 36.4 || .514 || – || .694 || 9.9 || 3.0 || 1.4 || 1.1 || 21.6
|-
| style="text-align:left;"| 1987
| style="text-align:left;"| Milwaukee
| 12 || 10 || 36.9 || .488 || – || .687 || 7.9 || 2.3 || 1.0 || 1.1 || 22.3
|-
| style="text-align:left;"| 1988
| style="text-align:left;"| Milwaukee
| 5 || 5 || 38.6 || .562 || – || .659 || 7.8 || 2.6 || 1.8 || .6 || 25.8
|-
| style="text-align:left;"| 1989
| style="text-align:left;"| Milwaukee
| 5 || 4 || 24.8 || .362 || .000 || .875 || 6.6 || 1.4 || .6 || .0 || 12.8
|-
| style="text-align:left;"| 1990
| style="text-align:left;"| San Antonio
| 10 || 10 || 37.5 || .528 || .200 || .808 || 9.4 || 2.2 || .7 || .4 || 24.9
|-
| style="text-align:left;"| 1991
| style="text-align:left;"| San Antonio
| 4 || 4 || 31.0 || .510 || .000 || .500 || 9.3 || 1.0 || .8 || .5 || 14.8
|-
| style="text-align:left;"| 1992
| style="text-align:left;"| San Antonio
| 3 || 3 || 40.7 || .515 || .000 || .500 || 11.3 || 2.3 || 1.3 || 1.3 || 26.0
|-
| style="text-align:left;"| 1993
| style="text-align:left;"| San Antonio
| 10 || 0 || 13.8 || .443 || .000 || .625 || 3.9 || .5 || .3 || .1 || 6.7
|-
| style="text-align:left;"| 1994
| style="text-align:left;"| San Antonio
| 4 || 1 || 18.0 || .500 || – || .833 || 6.3 || .5 || 1.3 || .8 || 8.0
|-
| style="text-align:left;"| 1995
| style="text-align:left;"| San Antonio
| 15 || 2 || 9.0 || .375 || .000 || .733 || 2.1 || .3 || .3 || .1 || 3.9
|-
| style="text-align:left;"| 1997
| style="text-align:left;"| Seattle
| 12 || 6 || 24.3 || .489 || – || .667 || 6.0 || 1.2 || .9 || .5 || 8.8
|-
| style="text-align:left;"| 1998
| style="text-align:left;"| New York
| 8 || 1 || 15.0 || .441 || – || .250 || 4.4 || .6 || .5 || .3 || 4.0
|- class="sortbottom"
| style="text-align:center;" colspan="2"| Career
| 110 || 68 || 26.9 || .502 || .091 || .706 || 6.7 || 1.6 || .9 || .6 || 15.1

See also
List of National Basketball Association career games played leaders
List of National Basketball Association top rookie scoring averages

References

External links
nba.com/historical/playerfile
NBA.com page
Career stats at basketball-reference.com
Terry Cummings' official web site

 "Top 30 Spurs"

1961 births
Living people
African-American basketball players
African-American Christians
All-American college men's basketball players
American men's basketball players
American Pentecostals
Basketball players from Chicago
DePaul Blue Demons men's basketball players
Golden State Warriors players
Members of the Church of God in Christ
Milwaukee Bucks players
National Basketball Association All-Stars
New York Knicks players
Philadelphia 76ers players
Power forwards (basketball)
San Antonio Spurs players
San Diego Clippers draft picks
San Diego Clippers players
Seattle SuperSonics players